Maurice Moritz was a Belgian racing cyclist. He won the 1913 edition of the Liège–Bastogne–Liège.

References

External links

Year of birth missing
Year of death missing
Belgian male cyclists
Place of birth missing